Al-Rashid Islamic Institute, is an Islamic institute and seminary in Cornwall, Ontario, Canada. Under the instructions and guidance of Shaikhul-Hadith Moulana Muhammad Zakariya, the institute was founded in 1980 at a temporary location in Montreal. The institute moved to Cornwall in 1985. The institute is now an Islamic university offering higher Islamic studies.

See also
 Darul Uloom
 Darul Uloom Deoband

References

1980 establishments in Quebec
Deobandi Islamic universities and colleges